James Francis Thorpe (Sac and Fox (Sauk): Wa-Tho-Huk, translated as "Bright Path"; May 22 or 28, 1887March 28, 1953) was an American athlete and Olympic gold medalist. A member of the Sac and Fox Nation, Thorpe was the first Native American to win a gold medal for the United States in the Olympics. Considered one of the most versatile athletes of modern sports, he won two Olympic gold medals in the 1912 Summer Olympics (one in classic pentathlon and the other in decathlon). He also played football (collegiate and professional), professional baseball, and basketball.

He lost his Olympic titles after it was found he had been paid for playing two seasons of semi-professional baseball before competing in the Olympics, thus violating the contemporary amateurism rules. In 1983, 30 years after his death, the International Olympic Committee (IOC) restored his Olympic medals with replicas, after ruling that the decision to strip him of his medals fell outside of the required 30 days. Official IOC records still listed Thorpe as co-champion in decathlon and pentathlon until 2022, when it was decided to restore him as the sole champion in both events.

Thorpe grew up in the Sac and Fox Nation in Indian Territory (what is now the U.S. state of Oklahoma). As a youth, he attended Carlisle Indian Industrial School in Carlisle, Pennsylvania, where he was a two-time All-American for the school's football team under coach Pop Warner. After his Olympic success in 1912, which included a record score in the decathlon, he added a victory in the All-Around Championship of the Amateur Athletic Union. In 1913, he played for the Pine Village Pros in Indiana. Later in 1913, Thorpe signed with the New York Giants, and he played six seasons in Major League Baseball between 1913 and 1919. Thorpe joined the Canton Bulldogs American football team in 1915, helping them win three professional championships. He later played for six teams in the National Football League (NFL). He played as part of several all-American Indian teams throughout his career, and barnstormed as a professional basketball player with a team composed entirely of American Indians.

From 1920 to 1921, Thorpe was nominally the first president of the American Professional Football Association, which became the NFL in 1922. He played professional sports until age 41, the end of his sports career coinciding with the start of the Great Depression.  He struggled to earn a living after that, working several odd jobs. He suffered from alcoholism, and lived his last years in failing health and poverty. He was married three times and had eight children, including Grace Thorpe, an environmentalist and Native rights activist, before suffering from heart failure and dying in 1953.

Thorpe has received numerous accolades for his athletic accomplishments. The Associated Press ranked him as the "greatest athlete" from the first 50 years of the 20th century, and the Pro Football Hall of Fame inducted him as part of its inaugural class in 1963. The town of Jim Thorpe, Pennsylvania was named in his honor. It has a monument site that contains his remains, which were the subject of legal action. Thorpe appeared in several films and was portrayed by Burt Lancaster in the 1951 film Jim Thorpe – All-American.

Early life 
Information about Thorpe's birth, name and ethnic background varies widely. He was baptized "Jacobus Franciscus Thorpe" in the Catholic Church.  Thorpe was born in Indian Territory of the United States (later Oklahoma), but no birth certificate has been found.  He was generally considered to have been born on May 22, 1887, near the town of Prague. Thorpe said in a note to The Shawnee News-Star in 1943 that he was born May 28, 1888, "near and south of Bellemont – Pottawatomie County – along the banks of the North Fork River ... hope this will clear up the inquiries as to my birthplace." Most biographers believe that he was born on May 22, 1887, the date listed on his baptismal certificate. Thorpe referred to Shawnee as his birthplace in his 1943 note to the newspaper.

Thorpe's parents were both of mixed-race ancestry. His father, Hiram Thorpe, had an Irish father and a Sac and Fox Indian mother. His mother, Charlotte Vieux, had a French father and a Potawatomi mother, a descendant of Chief Louis Vieux. Thorpe was raised as a Sac and Fox, and his native name, Wa-Tho-Huk, is translated as "path lit by great flash of lightning" or, more simply, "Bright Path". As was the custom for Sac and Fox, he was named for something occurring around the time of his birth, in this case the light brightening the path to the cabin where he was born. Thorpe's parents were both Roman Catholic, a faith which Thorpe observed throughout his adult life.

Thorpe attended the Sac and Fox Indian Agency school in Stroud, with his twin brother, Charlie. Charlie helped him through school until he died of pneumonia when they were nine years old. Thorpe ran away from school several times. His father sent him to the Haskell Institute, an Indian boarding school in Lawrence, Kansas, so that he would not run away again.

When Thorpe's mother died of childbirth complications two years later, the youth became depressed. After several arguments with his father, he left home to work on a horse ranch.

In 1904, the sixteen-year-old Thorpe returned to his father and decided to attend Carlisle Indian Industrial School in Carlisle, Pennsylvania. There his athletic ability was recognized and he was coached by Glenn Scobey "Pop" Warner, one of the most influential coaches of early American football history. Later that year the youth was orphaned after his father Hiram Thorpe died from gangrene poisoning, after being wounded in a hunting accident. The young Thorpe again dropped out of school. He resumed farm work for a few years before returning to Carlisle School.

Amateur career

College career 

Thorpe began his athletic career at Carlisle in 1907 when he walked past the track and, still in street clothes, beat all the school's high jumpers with an impromptu 5-ft 9-in jump. His earliest recorded track and field results come from 1907. He also competed in football, baseball, lacrosse, and ballroom dancing, winning the 1912 intercollegiate ballroom dancing championship.

Pop Warner was hesitant to allow Thorpe, his best track and field athlete, to compete in such a physical game as football. Thorpe, however, convinced Warner to let him try some rushing plays in practice against the school team's defense; Warner assumed he would be tackled easily and give up the idea. Thorpe "ran around past and through them not once, but twice". He walked over to Warner and said, "Nobody is going to tackle Jim", while flipping him the ball.

Thorpe first gained nationwide notice in 1911 for his athletic ability. As a running back, defensive back, placekicker and punter, Thorpe scored all of his team's four field goals in an 18–15 upset of Harvard, a top-ranked team in the early days of the National Collegiate Athletic Association (NCAA). His team finished the season 11–1. In 1912 Carlisle won the national collegiate championship largely as a result of Thorpe's efforts: he scored 25 touchdowns and 198 points during the season, according to CNN's Greg Botelho. Steve Boda, a researcher for the NCAA, credits Thorpe with 27 touchdowns and 224 points. Thorpe rushed 191 times for 1,869 yards, according to Boda; the figures do not include statistics from two of Carlisle's 14 games in 1912 because full records are not available.

Carlisle's 1912 record included a 27–6 victory over the West Point Army team. In that game, Thorpe's 92-yard touchdown was nullified by a teammate's penalty, but on the next play Thorpe rushed for a 97-yard touchdown. Future President Dwight D. Eisenhower, who played against him in that game, recalled of Thorpe in a 1961 speech:

Here and there, there are some people who are supremely endowed. My memory goes back to Jim Thorpe. He never practiced in his life, and he could do anything better than any other football player I ever saw.

Thorpe was awarded third-team All-American honors in 1908, and named a first-team All-American in 1911 and 1912. Football was – and remained – Thorpe's favorite sport. He did not compete in track and field in 1910 or 1911, although this turned out to be the sport in which he gained his greatest fame.

In the spring of 1912, he started training for the Olympics. He had confined his efforts to jumps, hurdles and shot-puts, but now added pole vaulting, javelin, discus, hammer and 56 lb weight. In the Olympic trials held at Celtic Park in New York, his all-round ability stood out in all these events and so he earned a place on the team that went to Sweden.

Olympic career 
For the 1912 Summer Olympics in Stockholm, Sweden, two new multi-event disciplines were included, the pentathlon and the decathlon. A pentathlon, based on the ancient Greek event, had been introduced at the 1906 Intercalated Games. The 1912 version consisted of the long jump, javelin throw, 200-meter dash, discus throw, and 1500-meter run.

The decathlon was a relatively new event in modern athletics, although a similar competition known as the all-around championship had been part of American track meets since the 1880s. A men's version had been featured on the program of the 1904 St. Louis Olympics. The events of the new decathlon differed slightly from the American version.

Both events seemed appropriate for Thorpe, who was so versatile that he served as Carlisle's one-man team in several track meets. According to his obituary in The New York Times, he could run the 100-yard dash in 10 seconds flat; the 220 in 21.8 seconds; the 440 in 51.8 seconds; the 880 in 1:57, the mile in 4:35; the 120-yard high hurdles in 15 seconds; and the 220-yard low hurdles in 24 seconds. He could long jump 23 ft 6 in and high-jump 6 ft 5 in. He could pole vault 11 feet; put the shot 47 ft 9 in; throw the javelin 163 feet; and throw the discus 136 feet.

Thorpe entered the U.S. Olympic trials for both the pentathlon and the decathlon. He easily earned a place on the pentathlon team, winning three events. The decathlon trial was subsequently cancelled, and Thorpe was chosen to represent the U.S. in the event. The pentathlon and decathlon teams also included Avery Brundage, a future International Olympic Committee president.

Thorpe was extremely busy in the Olympics. Along with the decathlon and pentathlon, he competed in the long jump and high jump. The first competition was the pentathlon on July 7. He won four of the five events and placed third in the javelin, an event he had not competed in before 1912. Although the pentathlon was primarily decided on place points, points were also earned for the marks achieved in the individual events. Thorpe won the gold medal. That same day, he qualified for the high jump final, in which he finished in a tie for fourth. On July 12, Thorpe placed seventh in the long jump.

Thorpe's final event was the decathlon, his first (and as it turned out, his only) decathlon. Strong competition from local favorite Hugo Wieslander was expected. Thorpe, however, defeated Wieslander by 688 points. He placed in the top four in all ten events, and his Olympic record of 8,413 points stood for nearly two decades. Even more remarkably, because someone had stolen his shoes just before he was due to compete, he found a mismatched pair of replacements, including one from a trash can, and won the gold medal wearing them. Overall, Thorpe won eight of the 15 individual events comprising the pentathlon and decathlon.

As was the custom of the day, the medals were presented to the athletes during the closing ceremonies of the games. Along with the two gold medals, Thorpe also received two challenge prizes, which were donated by King Gustav V of Sweden for the decathlon and Czar Nicholas II of Russia for the pentathlon. Several sources recount that, when awarding Thorpe his prize, King Gustav said, "You, sir, are the greatest athlete in the world", to which Thorpe replied, "Thanks, King". Thorpe biographer Kate Buford suggests that the story is apocryphal, as she believes that such a comment "would have been out of character for a man who was highly uncomfortable in public ceremonies and hated to stand out." The anecdote appeared in newspapers by 1948, 36 years after his appearance in the Olympics and time for myth making, and in books as early as 1952.

Thorpe's successes were followed in the United States. On the Olympic team's return, Thorpe was the star attraction in a ticker-tape parade on Broadway. He remembered later, "I heard people yelling my name, and I couldn't realize how one fellow could have so many friends."

Apart from his track and field appearances, Thorpe also played in one of two exhibition baseball games at the 1912 Olympics, which featured two teams composed mostly of U.S. track and field athletes. Thorpe had previous experience in the sport, as the public soon learned.

All-Around champion 
After his victories at the Olympic Games in Sweden, on September 2, 1912, Thorpe returned to Celtic Park, the home of the Irish American Athletic Club, in Queens, New York (where he had qualified four months earlier for the Olympic Games), to compete in the Amateur Athletic Union's All-Around Championship. Competing against Bruno Brodd of the Irish American Athletic Club and John L. Bredemus of Princeton University, he won seven of the ten events contested and came in second in the remaining three. With a total point score of 7,476 points, Thorpe broke the previous record of 7,385 points set in 1909 (also at Celtic Park), by Martin Sheridan, the champion athlete of the Irish American Athletic Club. Sheridan, a five-time Olympic gold medalist, was present to watch his record broken. He approached Thorpe after the event and shook his hand saying, "Jim, my boy, you're a great man. I never expect to look upon a finer athlete."  He told a reporter from New York World, "Thorpe is the greatest athlete that ever lived. He has me beaten fifty ways. Even when I was in my prime, I could not do what he did today."

Controversy 
In 1912, strict rules regarding amateurism were in effect for athletes participating in the Olympics. Athletes who received money prizes for competitions, were sports teachers, or had competed previously against professionals were not considered amateurs. They were barred from competition.

In late January 1913, the Worcester Telegram reported that Thorpe had played professional baseball before the Olympics, and other U.S. newspapers followed up the story. Thorpe had played professional baseball in the Eastern Carolina League for Rocky Mount, North Carolina, in 1909 and 1910, receiving meager pay; reportedly as little as US$2 ($ today) per game and as much as US$35 ($ today) per week. College players, in fact, regularly spent summers playing professionally in order to earn some money, but most used aliases, unlike Thorpe. Although the public did not seem to care much about Thorpe's past, the Amateur Athletic Union (AAU), and especially its secretary James Edward Sullivan, took the case very seriously.

Thorpe wrote a letter to Sullivan, in which he admitted playing professional baseball:

His letter did not help. The AAU decided to withdraw Thorpe's amateur status retroactively. Later that year, the International Olympic Committee (IOC) unanimously decided to strip Thorpe of his Olympic titles, medals and awards, and declare him a professional.

Although Thorpe had played for money, the AAU and IOC did not follow their own rules for disqualification. The rulebook for the 1912 Olympics stated that protests had to be made "within 30 days from the closing ceremonies of the games." The first newspaper reports did not appear until January 1913, about six months after the Stockholm Games had concluded. There is also some evidence that Thorpe was known to have played professional baseball before the Olympics, but the AAU had ignored the issue until being confronted with it in 1913.  The only positive aspect of this affair for Thorpe was that, as soon as the news was reported that he had been declared a professional, he received offers from professional sports clubs.

Professional career

Baseball free agent 
Because the minor league team that last held Jim Thorpe's contract had disbanded in 1910, the athlete had the unusual status as a sought-after free agent at the major league level during the era of the reserve clause. He could choose the baseball team for which to play. In January 1913, he turned down a starting position with the St. Louis Browns, then at the bottom of the American League. He chose to join the 1912 National League champion New York Giants. With Thorpe playing in 19 of their 151 games, they repeated as the 1913 National League champions. Immediately following the Giants' October loss in the 1913 World Series, Thorpe and the Giants joined the Chicago White Sox for a world tour. Barnstorming across the United States and around the world, Thorpe was the celebrity of the tour. Thorpe's presence increased the publicity, attendance and gate receipts for the tour. He met with Pope Pius X and Abbas II Hilmi Bey (the last Khedive of Egypt), and played before 20,000 people in London including King George V. Thorpe was the last man to compete in both the Olympics (in a non-baseball sport) and Major League Baseball before Eddy Alvarez did the same in 2020.

Baseball, football, and other sports 

Thorpe signed with the New York Giants baseball club in 1913 and played sporadically with them as an outfielder for three seasons. After playing in the minor leagues with the Milwaukee Brewers in 1916, he returned to the Giants in 1917. He was sold to the Cincinnati Reds early in the season. In the "double no-hitter" between Fred Toney of the Reds and Hippo Vaughn of the Chicago Cubs, Thorpe drove in the winning run in the 10th inning. Late in the season, he was sold back to the Giants. Again, he played sporadically for them in 1918 before being traded to the Boston Braves on May 21, 1919, for Pat Ragan. In his career, he amassed 91 runs scored, 82 runs batted in and a .252 batting average over 289 games. He continued to play minor league baseball until 1922, and once played for the minor league Toledo Mud Hens.

But Thorpe had not abandoned football either. He first played professional football in 1913 as a member of the Indiana-based Pine Village Pros, a team that had a several-season winning streak against local teams during the 1910s. He signed with the Canton Bulldogs in 1915. They paid him $250 ($ today) a game, a tremendous wage at the time. Before signing him Canton was averaging 1,200 fans a game, but 8,000 showed up for Thorpe's debut against the Massillon Tigers. The team won titles in 1916, 1917, and 1919. Thorpe reportedly ended the 1919 championship game by kicking a wind-assisted 95-yard punt from his team's own 5-yard line, effectively putting the game out of reach.

In 1920, the Bulldogs were one of 14 teams to form the American Professional Football Association, which became the National Football League (NFL) two years later. Thorpe was nominally their first president, but spent most of the year playing for Canton; a year later, he was replaced as president by Joseph Carr. He continued to play for Canton, coaching the team as well. Between 1921 and 1923, he helped organize and played for the Oorang Indians (LaRue, Ohio), an all-Native American team. Although the team's record was 3–6 in 1922, and 1–10 in 1923, Thorpe played well and was selected for the Green Bay Press-Gazette first All-NFL team in 1923. This was later formally recognized in 1931 by the NFL as the league's official All-NFL team).

Thorpe never played for an NFL championship team. He retired from professional football at age 41, having played 52 games for six teams from 1920 to 1928.

Most of Thorpe's biographers were unaware of his basketball career until a ticket that documented his time in professional basketball was discovered in an old book in 2005. By 1926, he was the main feature of the "World Famous Indians" of LaRue, a traveling basketball team. "Jim Thorpe's world famous Indians" barnstormed for at least two years (1927–28) in multiple states. Although stories about Thorpe's team were published in some local newspapers at the time, his basketball career is not well-documented. For a brief time in 1913, he was considering going into professional hockey for the Tecumseh Hockey Club in Toronto, Ontario, Canada.

Marriage and family 

Thorpe married three times and had a total of eight children. In 1913, Thorpe married Iva M. Miller, whom he had met at Carlisle. In 1917, Iva and Thorpe bought a house now known as the Jim Thorpe House in Yale, Oklahoma, and lived there until 1923. They had four children: James F., Gale, Charlotte, and Grace Frances, an environmentalist and Native rights activist. Miller filed for divorce from Thorpe in 1925, claiming desertion.

In 1926, Thorpe married Freeda Verona Kirkpatrick (September 19, 1905 – March 2, 2007). She was working for the manager of the baseball team for which he was playing at the time. They had four sons: Phillip, William, Richard, and John Thorpe. Kirkpatrick divorced Thorpe in 1941, after they had been married for 15 years.

Lastly, Thorpe married Patricia Gladys Askew on June 2, 1945. She was with him when he died.

Later life, film career, and death 

After his athletic career, Thorpe struggled to provide for his family. He found it difficult to work a non-sports-related job and never held a job for an extended period of time. During the Great Depression in particular, he had various jobs, among others as an extra for several movies, usually playing an American Indian chief in Westerns. In the 1932 comedy Always Kickin, Thorpe was prominently cast in a speaking part as himself, a kicking coach teaching young football players to drop-kick. In 1931, during the Great Depression, he sold the film rights to his life story to MGM for $1,500 ($ today). Thorpe portrayed an umpire in the 1940 film Knute Rockne, All American. He played a member of the Navajo Nation in the 1950 film Wagon Master.

Thorpe was memorialized in the Warner Bros. film Jim Thorpe – All-American (1951), starring Burt Lancaster. The film was directed by Michael Curtiz. Although there were rumors that Thorpe received no money, he was paid $15,000 by Warner Bros. plus a $2,500 donation toward an annuity for him by the studio head of publicity. The movie included archival footage of the 1912 and 1932 Olympics. Thorpe was seen in one scene as a coaching assistant. It was also distributed in the United Kingdom, where it was called Man of Bronze.

Apart from his career in films, he worked as a construction worker, a doorman/bouncer, a security guard, and a ditchdigger. He briefly joined the United States Merchant Marine in 1945, during World War II. Thorpe was a chronic alcoholic during his later life. He ran out of money sometime in the early 1950s. When hospitalized for lip cancer in 1950, Thorpe was admitted as a charity case. At a press conference announcing the procedure, his wife, Patricia, wept and pleaded for help, saying, "We're broke ... Jim has nothing but his name and his memories. He has spent money on his own people and has given it away. He has often been exploited."

In early 1953, Thorpe went into heart failure for the third time while dining with Patricia in their home in Lomita, California. He was briefly revived by artificial respiration and spoke to those around him, but lost consciousness shortly afterward. He died on March 28 at the age of 65.

Victim of racism 
Thorpe, whose parents were both half Caucasian, was raised as a Native American. He accomplished his athletic feats despite the severe racial inequality of the United States. It has often been suggested that his Olympic medals were stripped by the athletic officials because of his ethnicity. While it is difficult to prove this, the public comment at the time largely reflected this view. At the time Thorpe won his gold medals, not all Native Americans were recognized as U.S. citizens (the U.S. government had frequently demanded that they make concessions to adopt European-American ways to receive such recognition). Citizenship was not granted to all American Indians until 1924.

When Thorpe attended Carlisle, the students' ethnicity was used for marketing purposes. The football team was called the Indians. To create headlines, the school and journalists often portrayed sporting competitions as conflicts of Indians against whites. The first notice of Thorpe in The New York Times was headlined "Indian Thorpe in Olympiad; Redskin from Carlisle Will Strive for Place on American Team." Throughout his life, Thorpe's accomplishments were described in a similar racial context by other newspapers and sportswriters, which reflected the era.

Legacy

Olympic awards reinstated 

Over the years, supporters of Thorpe attempted to have his Olympic titles reinstated. US Olympic officials, including former teammate and later president of the IOC Avery Brundage, rebuffed several attempts. Brundage once said, "Ignorance is no excuse." Most persistent were the author Robert Wheeler and his wife, Florence Ridlon. They succeeded in having the AAU and United States Olympic Committee overturn its decision and restore Thorpe's amateur status before 1913.

In 1982, Wheeler and Ridlon established the Jim Thorpe Foundation and gained support from the U.S. Congress. Armed with this support and evidence from 1912 proving that Thorpe's disqualification had occurred after the 30-day time period allowed by Olympics rules, they succeeded in making the case to the IOC. In October 1982, the IOC Executive Committee approved Thorpe's reinstatement. In an unusual ruling, they declared that Thorpe was co-champion with Ferdinand Bie and Wieslander, although both of these athletes had always said they considered Thorpe to be the only champion. In a ceremony on January 18, 1983, the IOC presented two of Thorpe's children, Gale and Bill, with commemorative medals. Thorpe's original medals had been held in museums, but they were stolen and have never been recovered. The IOC listed Thorpe as a co-gold medalist.

In July 2020, a petition from Bright Path Strong began circulating that called upon the IOC to reinstate Thorpe as the sole winner in his events in the 1912 Olympics. It was backed by Pictureworks Entertainment, which is making a film about Thorpe. The petition was supported by Olympian Billy Mills, who won a gold medal in the 10,000 meters at the 1964 Tokyo Games. The IOC voted to reinstate Thorpe as the sole winner of both events on July 14, 2022.

Honors

Thorpe's monument, featuring the quote from Gustav V ("You, sir, are the greatest athlete in the world."), still stands near the town named for him, Jim Thorpe, Pennsylvania. The grave rests on mounds of soil from Thorpe's native Oklahoma and from the stadium in which he won his Olympic medals.

Thorpe's achievements received great acclaim from sports journalists, both during his lifetime and since his death. In 1950, an Associated Press poll of almost 400 sportswriters and broadcasters voted Thorpe the "greatest athlete" of the first half of the 20th century. That same year, the Associated Press ranked Thorpe as the "greatest American football player" of the first half of the century. Pro Football Hall of Fame voters selected him for the NFL 50th Anniversary All-Time Team in 1967. In 1999, the Associated Press placed him third on its list of the top athletes of the century, following Babe Ruth and Michael Jordan. ESPN ranked Thorpe seventh on their list of best North American athletes of the century.

Thorpe was inducted into the Pro Football Hall of Fame in 1963, one of seventeen players in the charter class. Thorpe is memorialized in the Pro Football Hall of Fame rotunda with a larger-than-life statue. He was also inducted into halls of fame for college football, American Olympic teams, and the national track and field competition.

In 2018, Thorpe became one of the inductees in the first induction ceremony held by the National Native American Hall of Fame. The fitness center and a hall at Haskell Indian Nations University are named in honor of Thorpe.

President Richard Nixon, as authorized by U.S. Senate Joint Resolution 73, proclaimed Monday, April 16, 1973, as "Jim Thorpe Day" to promote nationwide recognition of Thorpe's life. In 1986, the Jim Thorpe Association established an award with Thorpe's name. The Jim Thorpe Award is given annually to the best defensive back in college football. The annual Thorpe Cup athletics meeting is named in his honor. The United States Postal Service issued a 32¢ stamp on February 3, 1998, as part of the Celebrate the Century stamp sheet series.

In a poll of sports fans published in 2000 by ABC Sports, Thorpe was voted the Greatest Athlete of the Twentieth Century; the pool of 15 other top athletes included Muhammad Ali, Babe Ruth, Jesse Owens, Wayne Gretzky, Jack Nicklaus, and Michael Jordan.

In 2018, Thorpe was honored on the Native American dollar coin; proposed designs were released in 2015.

Jim Thorpe, Pennsylvania
After Thorpe's funeral was held at St. Benedict's Catholic Church in Shawnee, Oklahoma, his body lay in state at Fairview Cemetery. Residents had paid to have it returned to Shawnee by train from California. The people began a fund-raising effort to erect a memorial for Thorpe at the town's athletic park. Local officials had asked state legislators for funding, but a bill that included $25,000 for their proposal was vetoed by Governor Johnston Murray.

Meanwhile, Thorpe's third wife, unbeknownst to the rest of his family, took Thorpe's body and had it shipped to Pennsylvania when she heard that the small Pennsylvania towns of Mauch Chunk and East Mauch Chunk were seeking to attract business. She made a deal with officials which, according to Thorpe's son Jack, was made by the widowed Patricia for monetary considerations. The towns "bought" Thorpe's remains, erected a monument to him at the grave, merged, and renamed the newly united town in his honor as Jim Thorpe, Pennsylvania. Thorpe had never been there. The monument site contains his tomb, two statues of him in athletic poses, and historical markers recounting his life story.

In June 2010, Jack Thorpe filed a federal lawsuit against the borough of Jim Thorpe, seeking to have his father's remains returned to his homeland and re-interred near other family members in Oklahoma. Citing the Native American Graves Protection and Repatriation Act, Jack was arguing to bring his father's remains to the reservation in Oklahoma, to be buried near those of his father, sisters and brother, a mile from the place he was born. He claimed that the agreement between his stepmother and Jim Thorpe, Pennsylvania, borough officials was made against the wishes of other family members, who want him buried in Native American land. Jack Thorpe died at 73 on February 22, 2011.

In April 2013, U.S. District Judge Richard Caputo ruled that Jim Thorpe borough amounts to a museum under the Native American Graves Protection and Repatriation Act ("NAGPRA"), and therefore is bound by that law. A lawyer for Bill and Richard Thorpe said the men would pursue the legal process to have their father's remains returned to Sac and Fox land in central Oklahoma.  On October 23, 2014, the United States Court of Appeals for the Third Circuit reversed Judge Caputo's ruling.  The appeals court held that Jim Thorpe borough is not a "museum", as that term is used in NAGPRA, and that the plaintiffs therefore could not invoke that federal statute to seek reinterment of Thorpe's remains. In NAGPRA language, "'museum' means any institution or State or local government agency (including any institution of higher learning) that receives Federal funds and has possession of, or control over, Native American cultural items." The Court of Appeals directed the trial court to enter a judgment in favor of the borough. The appeals court said Pennsylvania law allows the plaintiffs to ask a state court to order reburial of Thorpe's remains, but noted, "once a body is interred there is great reluctance in permitting same to be moved, absent clear and compelling reasons for such a move." On October 5, 2015, the United States Supreme Court refused to hear the matter, effectively bringing the legal process to an end.

Jim Thorpe Marathon
The Jim Thorpe Area Running Festival is a series of races started in 2019 in Jim Thorpe, Pennsylvania. It includes a marathon, a 26.2 mile footrace that features a steady elevation drop from start to finish.

See also

Citations

General and cited sources 

 Bird, Elizabeth S. Dressing in Feathers: The Construction of the Indian in American Popular Culture. Boulder: Westview Press, 1996. .
 Bloom, John. There is a Madness in the Air: The 1926 Haskell Homecoming and Popular Representations of Sports in Federal and Indian Boarding Schools. ed. in Bird. Boulder: Westview Press. 1996. .
 Buford, Kate. Native American Son: The Life and Sporting Legend of Jim Thorpe. Lincoln: University of Nebraska Press, 2010. 
 Cava, Pete (Summer 1992). "Baseball in the Olympics" . Citius, Altius, Fortius. 1 (1): 7–15. Retrieved May 4, 2017.
 Cook, William A. Jim Thorpe: A Biography. Jefferson: McFarland & Company, 2011. .
 Dodge, Robert. Which Chosen People? Manifest Destiny Meets the Sioux: As Seen by Frank Fiske, Frontier Photographer. New York: Algora Publishing, 2013. .
 Dyreson, Mark. Making the American Team: Sport, Culture, and the Olympic Experience. Urbana: University of Illinois Press, 1998. .
 Elfers, James E. The Tour to End All Tours. Nebraska: University of Nebraska Press, 2003. .
 Findling, John E. and Pelle, Kimberly D., eds. Encyclopedia of the Modern Olympic Movement. Westport: Greenwood Press, 2004. .
 Gerasimo, Luisa and Whiteley, Sandra. The Teacher's Calendar of Famous Birthdays. McGraw-Hill, 2003. .
 Hilger, Michael. Native Americans in the Movies: Portrayals from Silent Films to the Present. Lanham: Rowman & Littlefield, 2015. .
 Hoxie, Frederick E. Encyclopedia of North American Indians. New York: Houghton Mifflin Books, 1996. .
 Jeansonne, Glen. A Time of Paradox: America Since 1890. Rowman & Littlefield, 2006. .
 Landrum, Dr. Gene. Empowerment: The Competitive Edge in Sports, Business & Life. Brendan Kelly Publishing Incorporated, 2006. .
 Lincoln, Kenneth and Slagle, Al Logan. The Good Red Road: Passages into Native America. University of Nebraska Press, 1997. .
 Magill, Frank Northern. Great Lives from History. New York: Salem Press, 1987. .
 Neft, David S., Cohen, Richard M., and Korch, Rick. The Complete History of Professional Football from 1892 to the Present. New York: St. Martin's Press, 1994. .
 O'Hanlon-Lincoln, Ceane. Chronicles: A Vivid Collection of Fayette County, Pennsylvania Histories. Mechling Bookbindery, 2006. .
 Quirk, Charles E., ed. Sports and the Law: Major Legal Cases. London: Routledge, 2014. .
 Rogge, M. Jacque, Johnson, Michael, and Rendell, Matt. The Olympics: Athens to Athens 1896–2004. Sterling Publishing, 2004. .
 Schaffer, Kay and Smith, Sidonie. The Olympics at the Millennium: Power, Politics and the Games. Rutger University Press, 2000. .
 Watterson, John Sayle. College Football: history, spectacle, controversy. Johns Hopkins University Press, 2000. .
 Wheeler, Robert W. Jim Thorpe, World's Greatest Athlete. University of Oklahoma Press, 1979. .
 Williams, Randy. Sports Cinema 100 Movies: The Best of Hollywood's Athletic Heroes, Losers, Myths, and Misfits. Pompton Plains: Limelight Editions, 2006. .
 Zarnowski, Frank. All-Around Men: Heroes of a Forgotten Sport. Lanham: Scarecrow Press, 2005. 
 Zarnowski, Frank. The Pentathlon of the Ancient World. Jefferson: McFarland & Company, 2013. .

Further reading 

 Benjey, Tom. Doctors, Lawyers, Indian Chiefs. Carlisle, Pennsylvania: Tuxedo Press, 2008. .
 "In the Matter of Jacobus Franciscus Thorpe" in Bill Mallon and Ture Widlund, The 1912 Olympic Games: Results for All Competitors in All Events, with Commentary. Jefferson, North Carolina: McFarland, 2002. .
 
 Newcombe, Jack. The Best of the Athletic Boys: The White Man's Impact on Jim Thorpe. Garden City, New York: Doubleday, 1975. .
 Updyke, Rosemary Kissinger. Jim Thorpe, the Legend Remembered. Gretna, Louisiana: Pelican, 1997. .
 Wallechinsky, David. The Complete Book of the Summer Olympics. Woodstock, New York: Overlook Press, 2000. .

External links

 
 
 
 
 
 
 

1887 births
1953 deaths
20th-century American male actors
20th-century Native Americans
Akron Buckeyes players
All-American college football players
American ballroom dancers
American football drop kickers
American football running backs
American male decathletes
American male film actors
American men's basketball players
American pentathletes
American people of French descent
American people of Irish descent
American sailors
American twins
Athletes (track and field) at the 1912 Summer Olympics
Baseball controversies
Baseball players at the 1912 Summer Olympics
Baseball players from Oklahoma
Basketball players from Oklahoma
Basketball players from Pennsylvania
Boston Braves players
Canton Bulldogs coaches
Canton Bulldogs players
Canton Bulldogs (Ohio League) players
Carlisle Indians baseball players
Carlisle Indians football players
Catholics from California
Catholics from Oklahoma
Catholics from Pennsylvania
Chicago Cardinals players
Cincinnati Reds players
Cleveland Indians (NFL) players
Cleveland Tigers-Indians coaches
College Football Hall of Fame inductees
Fayetteville Highlanders players
Harrisburg Senators players
Hartford Senators players
Identical twins
Indiana Hoosiers football coaches
Jersey City Skeeters players
Major League Baseball outfielders
Male actors from Oklahoma
Medalists at the 1912 Summer Olympics
Military personnel from Oklahoma
Milwaukee Brewers (minor league) players
National Football League commissioners
National Football League founders
Native American male actors
Native American players of American football
Native American sportspeople
New York Giants (NL) players
New York Giants players
Newark Indians players
Olympic baseball players of the United States
Olympic decathletes
Olympic gold medalists for the United States in track and field
Olympic male pentathletes
Oorang Indians players
People from Carlisle, Pennsylvania
People from Lincoln County, Oklahoma
People from Lomita, California
People from Pottawatomie County, Oklahoma
Players of American football from Oklahoma
Portland Beavers players
Pro Football Hall of Fame inductees
Rock Island Independents players
Rocky Mount Railroaders players
Sac and Fox people
Sportspeople from Shawnee, Oklahoma
Toledo Mud Hens players
Track and field athletes in the National Football League
Twin sportspeople
United States Merchant Mariners
United States Merchant Mariners of World War II
Worcester Boosters players